As a Man Thinketh is a self-help book by James Allen, published in 1903.  It was described by Allen as "... [dealing] with the power of thought, and particularly with the use and application of thought to happy and beautiful issues. I have tried to make the book simple, so that all can easily grasp and follow its teaching, and put into practice the methods which it advises. It shows how, in his own thought-world, each man holds the key to every condition, good or bad, that enters into his life, and that, by working patiently and intelligently upon his thoughts, he may remake his life, and transform his circumstances. The price of the book is only one shilling, and it can be carried in the pocket."  It was also described by Allen as "A book that will help you to help yourself", "A pocket companion for thoughtful people", and "A book on the power and right application of thought."

Basis of the book 

The title is influenced by a verse in the Bible from the Book of Proverbs, chapter 23, verse 7: "As a man thinketh in his heart, so is he".  The full passage, taken from the King James Version, is as follows:

While the passage suggests that one should consider the true motivations of a person who is being uncharacteristically generous before accepting his generosity, the title and content of Allen's work refer to the reader himself.

Allen's essay is now in the public domain within the United States and most other countries. It was released October 1, 2003 as a Project Gutenberg e-text edition.

About the book 

This book opens with the statement:

Chapter 1 starts with this quote from the Dhammapada, which explains the effect of karma.

In popular culture
The lyrics to the song "Good Thoughts, Bad Thoughts" by Funkadelic are loosely based on this book.

In the film Rumble Fish the character 'Motorcycle Boy' is reading pages 36–7 in the kitchen.

Rapper Gucci Mane cites this book as his inspiration for achieving sobriety and losing weight.

Marilyn Manson's song "Slave Only Dreams to Be King" from the album The Pale Emperor (2015) quotes Allen:

except that Manson's lyrics change Allen's "The Human Will" to "The Human Wheel".

In Manson's album Heaven Upside Down (2017), his song by the same name states "I don't attract what I want, I attract what I am," a reference to Allen's "Men do not attract that which they want, but that which they are."

Singer-songwriter Richard Marx says that he considers this book his Bible and always keeps it with him.

References

External links

 
 
An Illustrated Biography by John L Woodcock at JAI.ORG.UK

1902 non-fiction books
Philosophical literature
Books by James Allen (author)
Self-help books
New Thought literature